Judge Campbell may refer to:

David G. Campbell (born 1952), judge of the United States District Court for the District of Arizona
Edward Kernan Campbell (1858–1938), chief judge of the Court of Claims
John Wilson Campbell (1782–1833), judge of the United States District Court for the District of Ohio
Levin H. Campbell (born 1927), judge of the United States Court of Appeals for the First Circuit
Marcus Beach Campbell (1866–1944), judge of the United States District Court for the Eastern District of New York
Ralph E. Campbell (1867–1921), judge of the United States District Court for the Eastern District of Oklahoma
Tena Campbell (born 1944), judge of the United States District Court for the District of Utah
Todd J. Campbell (1956–2021), judge of the United States District Court for the Middle District of Tennessee
William Joseph Campbell (1905–1988), judge of the United States District Court for the Northern District of Illinois
William L. Campbell Jr. (born 1969), judge of the United States District Court for the Middle District of Tennessee

See also
Patricia E. Campbell-Smith (born 1966), judge of the United States Court of Federal Claims
Justice Campbell (disambiguation)